Gustavo Adrián López Pablo (born 13 April 1973) is an Argentinian former professional footballer who played as a left winger.

He spent the vast majority of his professional career in Spain, amassing La Liga totals of 310 matches and 33 goals during 11 seasons (13 in the country overall), playing for Zaragoza and Celta. He started his career with Independiente.

An Argentine international for nine years, López represented the nation at the 2002 World Cup and two Copa América tournaments.

Club career

Early years and Zaragoza
Born in Valentín Alsina, Buenos Aires, López began his career with local Club Atlético Independiente in 1991. He won four major titles during his spell there, all arriving in his last years.

In January 1996, López moved to Spain with Real Zaragoza for a club record 420 million pesetas, making his La Liga debut on the 7th in a 1–1 home draw against Rayo Vallecano. He scored five goals in 32 matches in his third full season, helping to the ninth position in the table; during most of his stint in Aragon, he partnered countryman Kily González.

Celta
López rejoined former Zaragoza manager Víctor Fernández at Celta de Vigo in summer 1999, and quickly became an essential first-team unit. He netted twice in five appearances in the 2000–01 edition of the Copa del Rey, helping the side to the final against his former club (1–3 loss in Seville), then contributed with 33 games (29 starts, 2.232 minutes of action) in the 2002–03 campaign as the Galicians finished fourth and qualified for the UEFA Champions League for the first time in their history.

At the end of 2006–07, after having suffered his second relegation with Celta and having already renewed his contract twice by reducing his wages, 34-year-old López decided to leave the club, amassing official totals of 292 matches and 29 goals. He retired at the end of the following season, also dropping down a level with Cádiz CF in Segunda División, then worked as commentator for Canal+ on their coverage of La Liga and for PRISA regarding the Argentine top level, as well as running training camps for children.

International career
López won 32 caps for Argentina and scored four goals, making his debut against Romania in December 1994. He represented the country at the 1997 and 1999 Copa América tournaments, being an unused squad member at the ill-fated 2002 FIFA World Cup in Japan and South Korea.

Additionally, López helped the under-23 side win the silver medal at the 1996 Summer Olympics in Atlanta, scoring in the 3–1 group stage win over the United States.

Managerial career
On June 15, 2022 López joined Diego Simeone's coaching staff in Atlético Madrid.

Honours
Independiente
Argentine Primera División: Clausura 1994
Supercopa Sudamericana: 1994, 1995
Recopa Sudamericana: 1995

Celta
UEFA Intertoto Cup: 2000
Copa del Rey: Runner-up 2000–01

Argentina
Summer Olympic Games: Silver medal 1996

References

External links
 
 
 

1973 births
Living people
Sportspeople from Lanús
Argentine people of Spanish descent
Citizens of Spain through descent
Argentine emigrants to Spain
Argentine footballers
Association football wingers
Argentine Primera División players
Club Atlético Independiente footballers
La Liga players
Segunda División players
Real Zaragoza players
RC Celta de Vigo players
Cádiz CF players
Argentina international footballers
2002 FIFA World Cup players
1995 King Fahd Cup players
1997 Copa América players
1999 Copa América players
Olympic footballers of Argentina
Footballers at the 1996 Summer Olympics
Olympic medalists in football
Medalists at the 1996 Summer Olympics
Olympic silver medalists for Argentina
Argentine expatriate footballers
Expatriate footballers in Spain
Argentine expatriate sportspeople in Spain